Hong Daeyong (12 May 1731 – 17 November 1783), styled Damheon ("Relaxed house") was a philosopher, astronomer and mathematician of the late Joseon Kingdom. Hong was an early leader of the  Profitable Usage and Benefiting the People school of thought.  It worked to promote the industrialization of his country and the development of trade by positively introducing Western technologies to Joseon Korea. Hong was a friend of Park Ji-won, who was another leader of the Profitable Usage school.

Early life

Hong Daeyong was born in 1731 in Cheonan, South Chungcheong Province. In his early days, Hong was educated by Kim One-hang of Seock-sil Seowon. During this period, traditional Neo-Confucianism formed the basis of his academic world. In 1765, Hong followed his uncle Hong Eock(), who was in Joseon missions to Imperial China. In China, Hong witnessed a brilliant development of Qing Dynasty and experienced culture shock. After returning to Joseon, Hong insisted enhancing the national prosperity.

Works

Hong was also interested in astronomy and mathematics. He maintained the rotundity of the Earth and Earth's rotation, which was rejected by Traditional Confucianists who thought the sky was globular and the ground was square. Also, He firmly rejected Anthropocentrism, thinking all things in nature are equal.

After failing the Gwageo a few times, Hong gave up and became absorbed in astronomy research. He wrote Catechism of Eusan mountain(), which contains the concepts of Earth's rotation and the equality among species and the infinity of outer space. In mathematics, Hong wrote Interpretation and Usage of Mathematics(). He also wrote Travel Essay of Yanjing in 1765 and 1766(), a journal about his travel to China.

Crown Prince

In 1774, Hong was recommended for a mentor of Crown Prince, who afterwards would be King Jeongjo. Hong discussed many topics and themes with crown prince. Although Crown Prince was satisfied with Hong's studies and polymathy, Hong found their difference of views among several topics and the conservatism of Prince. Crown prince demanded Hong to go into government service and be his own staff members, but Hong indicated his refusal in a roundabout way. Hong wrote Journal as the Mentor of Crown Prince(), which contains their debate contents.

After crown prince ascended the throne following the passing of the King Yeongjo, Hong was appointed to local county governor. In there he tried to test his progressive ideas in local society. However, his mother's health condition deteriorated in 1782, so Hong abandoned a service and came back to Seoul. In 1783, mother regained her health, but Hong had a sudden stroke. He wouldn't make it by morning, and breathed his last breath the next day. It was 23 October 1783(Lunisolar calendar) as 17 November 1783(Solar calendar).

Legacy

Hong's works, including Catechism of Ui mountain, Interpretation and Usage of Mathematics, Journal as the Mentor of Crown Prince were compiled to collection, Books of Relaxed House. His practical Confucian ideas were succeeded by Park Ji-won and Park's disciples, but his scientific thought and research were succeeded by nobody.

References

External links 

  Books of Relaxed House
  Catechism of Ui Mountain
  Journal as the Mentor of Crown Prince

18th-century Korean astronomers
Korean Confucianists
1731 births
1783 deaths
People from Cheonan
18th-century Korean poets
18th-century Korean scientists
18th-century Korean mathematicians
18th-century Korean philosophers
Korean mathematicians